British Westinghouse Electric and Manufacturing Co Ltd v Underground Electric Railways Co of London Ltd [1912] AC 673 is an English contract law case, concerning the duty to mitigate one's loss after a breach of contract.

Facts
The defendants (British Westinghouse Electric and Manufacturing Co Ltd) supplied the plaintiffs (Underground Electric Railways Co of London Ltd) with turbines which, in breach of contract, were deficient in power. The plaintiffs accepted and used the turbines but reserved their right to claim damages. Later they replaced the turbines with others which were far more efficient than those supplied by the defendants would have been, even if they had complied with the contract. The plaintiffs claimed to recover the cost of the substitute turbines as damages.

Judgment
The House of Lords held that in assessing the damages for the breach any loss sustained by the plaintiffs had to be balanced against any gain to them arising directly out of the steps they had taken to lessen the consequences of the breach. Although the plaintiffs had not been bound to buy the new machines, having done so the consequential gain in profits and saved expenses had to be brought into account. The savings exceeded the cost of the machines and so the plaintiffs recovered nothing under this head.

Giving the leading judgment, Viscount Haldane LC, 688–9, ‘the quantum of damage is a question of fact’. He set out the principles for determining the measure of damages.

The duty to mitigate is not to ‘take any step which a reasonable and prudent man would not ordinarily take in the course of his business.’ Only reasonable steps.

See also

English contract law

English contract case law
High Court of Justice cases
1912 in British law
1912 in case law
Railway litigation in 1912